Jonathan Dekker (born May 15, 1983) is a former American football tight end. He was signed by the Pittsburgh Steelers as an undrafted free agent in 2006. Dekker won Super Bowl XLIII with the Steelers over the Arizona Cardinals. He played college football at Princeton.

Early years
Dekker played high school football at Saint Thomas More in Milwaukee.

College career
Dekker played college football at Princeton. He finished his career with 64 receptions for 760 yards and five touchdowns.

Professional career
Dekker was signed by the Pittsburgh Steelers as a rookie free agent and spent the 2006 season on the practice squad. He played in three games for the Steelers in 2007. On August 16, 2008, he was waived injured before the season started, after suffering a preseason knee injury.  Dekker was part of the Super Bowl XLIII team that won the Super Bowl.

References

External links
Pittsburgh Steelers bio

1983 births
Living people
American football tight ends
Florida Tuskers players
People from Greenfield, Wisconsin
Pittsburgh Steelers players
Players of American football from Wisconsin
Princeton Tigers football players
Sportspeople from the Milwaukee metropolitan area